Finnish invasion of East Karelia may refer to:

Two operations during the Heimosodat ("Irredentist Wars") following World War I:
Viena expedition (1918)
Aunus expedition (1919)
Finnish invasion of East Karelia (1941) during World War II